Christopher Ray Johnson (born January 17, 1960, in Kansas City, Kansas) is an American computer scientist. He is a distinguished professor of computer science at the University of Utah, and founding director of the Scientific Computing and Imaging Institute (SCI). His research interests are in the areas of scientific computing and scientific visualization.

Biography 
Johnson received his BS in physics in 1982 from the Wright State University, and his MS in physics in 1984, and his PhD in medical biophysics in 1990, both from the University of Utah, in Salt Lake City.

From 1985 to 1989, Johnson was an assistant professor of physics at Westminster College (Utah).  In 1990, Johnson joined the University of Utah, first as a research assistant professor of internal medicine at the Nora Eccles Harrison Cardiovascular Research and Training Institute (CVRTI) and has held faculty positions in the departments of mathematics, bioengineering, physics, and computer science.  In 1996 he was appointed associate professor and associate chairman in the department of computer science.  In 2003, Johnson was promoted to the rank of distinguished professor of computer science at the University of Utah and served as the director of the University of Utah School of Computing.  Johnson served as the director of the ACCESS Program for Women in Science and Mathematics between 1993 and 1993 and a member of the ACCESS Faculty until 2003.   In 1999 he founded and directed the Engineering Scholars Program until 2004.

In 1992 Johnson founded the Scientific Computing and Imaging (SCI) research group at the University of Utah, which has since grown to become the Scientific Computing and Imaging Institute (SCI Institute) employing over 200 faculty, staff, and students. Johnson serves on several international journal editorial boards, as well as on advisory boards to several national and international research centers. In 2013 Johnson was elected to the board of directors of the Computing Research Association (CRA) and in 2012 Johnson was selected as a member of the executive committee of the IEEE Computer Society Technical Committee on Visualization and Graphics.

Johnson serves on several international journal editorial boards, as well as on advisory boards to several national and international research centers.

Awards 
 1992, Young Investigator's (FIRST) Award from the NIH
 1994, the NSF Presidential Young Investigator Award 
 1995, the NSF Presidential Faculty Fellow (PFF) award from President Clinton.
 1996, a DoE Computational Science Award, 
 1997, the Par Excellence Award from the University of Utah Alumni Association and the Presidential Teaching Scholar Award.
 1999, the Utah Governor's Medal for Science and Technology from Governor Michael Leavitt. 
 2003, the Distinguished Professor Award from the University of Utah. 
 2004, elected a Fellow of the American Institute for Medical and Biological Engineering. 
 2005, was elected a Fellow of the American Association for the Advancement of Science.
 2009, elected a Fellow of the Society for Industrial and Applied Mathematics (SIAM), and received the Utah Cyber Pioneer Award.
 2010, the Rosenblatt Prize for Excellence from the University of Utah and the IEEE Visualization Career Award 
 2012, the IEEE Computer Society Charles Babbage Award.
 2013, the IEEE Computer Society Sidney Fernbach Award "For outstanding contributions and pioneering work introducing computing, simulation, and visualization into many areas of biomedicine." 
 2014, elected an IEEE Fellow in recognition of his leadership in scientific computing and scientific visualization.

Selected publications
Books
 
 

Articles
 M. Kern, A. Lex, N. Gehlenborg, and C.R. Johnson. Interactive Visual Exploration and Refinement of Cluster Assignments. Journal of BMC Bioinformatics, vol. 18, no. 406, https://doi.org/10.1186/s12859-017-1813-7, 2017.
 M. Chen, G. Grinstein, C.R. Johnson, J. Kennedy, and M. Tory. Pathways for Theoretical Advances in Visualization. IEEE Computer Graphics and Applications, pp. 103–112, July, 2017.
 M. Larsen, K. Moreland, C.R. Johnson, and H. Childs. Optimizing Multi-Image Sort-Last Parallel Rendering. Proceedings of the IEEE Symposium on Large Data Analysis and Visualization, pp. 37–46, 2016.
 B. Hollister, G. Duffley, C. Butson, and C.R. Johnson. Visualization for Understanding Uncertainty in Activation Volumes for Deep Brain Stimulation, in Proceedings of the IEEE Eurographics Conference on Visualization (EuroVis) 2016, Editors: K.L. Ma G. Santucci, and J. van Wijk, pp. 37–41, 2016.
 P. Rosen, B. Burton, K. Potter, C.R. Johnson. muView: A Visual Analysis System for Exploring Uncertainty in Myocardial Ischemia Simulations, In Visualization in Medicine and Life Sciences III, Edited by L. Linsen, B. Hamann, and H.C. Hege, Springer, pp. 45–65. 2016.
 X. Tong, J. Edwards, C. Chen, H. Shen, C. R. Johnson, P. Wong. View-Dependent Streamline Deformation and Exploration, In IEEE Transactions on Visualization and Computer Graphics, vol. 22, no. 7, pp. 1788–1801, 2016
 H. De Sterck, C.R. Johnson. Data Science: What Is It and How Is It Taught?, In SIAM News, SIAM, July, 2015.
 
 
 
 
 
 
 
 
 
 
 
 

Reports

References

External links 
 Christopher Johnson, at University of Utah

Living people
American computer scientists
University of Utah alumni
University of Utah faculty
1960 births
Information visualization experts
Fellows of the Society for Industrial and Applied Mathematics
Fellow Members of the IEEE
Fellows of the American Association for the Advancement of Science
Fellows of the American Institute for Medical and Biological Engineering
Scientific computing researchers